Spang may refer to:

People 
 Andreas Spång, Swedish MMA fighter
 Bently Spang, Cheyenne artist
 Dan Spang, American ice hockey player
 Michael Grundt Spang, Norwegian journalist

Place names 
 Spang, a village in Germany
 Spang Township, Itasca County, Minnesota

Entertainment 
 Jack and Seraffimo Spang, two Bond villains from Diamonds Are Forever

Other uses 
 Spang beetle

See also 
 Spangle (disambiguation)
Spanging, another term for begging